Rintoul is a surname. Notable people with the surname include:

 Chad Rintoul (born 1974), Australian rules footballer
 Cole Rintoul (born 1982), Australian musician
 David Rintoul (born David Wilson, 1948), Scottish stage and television actor
 Douglas Rintoul, British playwright
 Gordon Rintoul (born 1955), Scottish museum director
 Harry Rintoul (1956–2002), Canadian playwright
 Ian Rintoul, Australian political activist
 Leonora Jeffrey Rintoul (1878–1953), Scottish ornithologist
 Robert Stephen Rintoul (1787–1858), British journalist
 Stuart Rintoul (born 1968), English cricketer
 William Rintoul (1870–1936), British chemist